Mishkino (Mişkä) is a rural locality (a village) in Yalangachevsky Selsoviet, Baltachevsky District, Bashkortostan, Russia. The population was 326 as of 2010. There are 4 streets.

Geography 
Mishkino is located 32 km southeast of Starobaltachevo (the district's administrative centre) by road. Yalangachevo is the nearest rural locality.

References 

Rural localities in Baltachevsky District